Emre Guler (Turkish: Emre Güler; born 19 January 1998) is a rugby league footballer who plays as a  for the Canberra Raiders in the NRL.

Background
Guler was born in Sydney, New South Wales, Australia, and is of Turkish descent. 

He played his junior rugby league for the Mascot Jets.

Playing career

2017
In 2017 Guler represented the NSW Under 20s and the Junior Kangaroos.

2018
In round 23 of the 2018 NRL season, Guler made his first grade debut for Canberra against the Sydney Roosters at Canberra Stadium.

2019
Guler made 11 appearances for Canberra in the 2019 NRL season as the club reached the grand final for the first time in 25 years.  Guler played from the bench in the club's 2019 NRL Grand Final defeat against the Sydney Roosters at ANZ Stadium.

On 7 October 2019, Guler was named on the bench for the U23 Junior Australian side.

2020
Guler scored his first try in the top grade in round 1 of the 2020 NRL season as Canberra defeated the Gold Coast 24-6.

Guler was limited to only eight appearances for Canberra in the 2020 NRL season. He played no part in the club's finals campaign as they reached the preliminary final but were defeated by Melbourne.

2021
Guler played 19 games for Canberra in the 2021 NRL season as the club finished 10th on the table.

References

External links
Canberra Raiders profile

1998 births
Living people
Australian people of Turkish descent
Australian rugby league players
Canberra Raiders players
Rugby league props
Rugby league players from Sydney
Turkey national rugby league team players
Turkish rugby league players